Shinee World 2017  (promoted as "SHINee WORLD 2017～FIVE～") was the fifth Japan nationwide concert tour by South Korean boy band Shinee, to promote their fifth Japanese studio album Five. The initial arena tour kicked off in Fukui on January 28, 2017, and ended in Tokyo on April 30, 2017, with a total of 25 concerts in 10 cities. It attracted a total of 338,238 fans. On June 22, 2017, concerts for SHINee WORLD 2017 ~FIVE~ Special Edition in Tokyo Dome and Osaka Dome were announced on Shinee's official Japanese website for September 2–3 and September 23–24, respectively. With the addition of the dome concerts, the tour wrapped up with a total of 29 shows and a total attendance of 539,000. This was their last tour with member Jonghyun who died on December 18, 2017.

Set list

Schedule

References

External links
SM Entertainment - Official website
Shinee - Official South Korean website
Shinee - Official Japanese website

Shinee concert tours
2017 concert tours